Dasht-e Azadi-ye Javardeh (also Romanized as Dasht-e Āzādī-ye Jāvardeh; also known as Dast Āzādī) is a village in Tayebi-ye Sarhadi-ye Sharqi Rural District, Charusa District, Kohgiluyeh County, Kohgiluyeh and Boyer-Ahmad Province, Iran. At the 2006 census, its population was 670, in 119 families.

References 

Populated places in Kohgiluyeh County